Christophe Royon is a French–American physicist who specializes in dark matter. He is a Foundation Distinguished Professor in the Department of Physics and Astronomy at the University of Kansas.

Early life and education
Royon earned the level of Aggregation of Physics and Master in Quantum Physics at Ecole Normale Superieure in 1990 and 1991 before enrolling at the University in Orsay for a PhD in physics.

Career
In 2016, Royon joined the Department of Physics and Astronomy at the University of Kansas as a Foundation Distinguished Professor. As a result of his rank, he received startup money to put together a team of researchers to work on discovering odderon. The researchers discovered the quasiparticle as a result of analyzing proton collisions at high speeds. In the same year, Royon was the recipient of the Humboldt Prize for his "pioneering work." In 2019, Royon earned a grant from NASA to design and build a particle telescope to launch into orbit aboard a satellite. He also received another grant to investigate interactions between quarks and gluons to better understand gluon saturation.

References

External links

Living people
21st-century American physicists
21st-century French physicists
University of Kansas faculty
Year of birth missing (living people)